HC Levski Sofia is an ice hockey team in Sofia, Bulgaria. They are part of the Levski Sofia sports club, and have played in the Bulgarian Hockey League since 1953.

History
The club was founded as HK Dinamo Sofia in 1953. After six years they became HK Levski Sofia, before merging with Spartak Sofia in 1969 to form Levski-Spartak Sofia. They won seven titles as Levski-Spartak from 1976-1982. In 1990, they took on their present name, HK Levski Sofia, and won four titles in the 1990s. The club is one of the most successful Bulgarian hockey teams, with 13 titles, and has won a record 17 Bulgarian Cup titles.

Achievements
 Bulgarian Champion (13): 1976, 1977, 1978, 1979, 1980, 1981, 1982, 1989, 1990, 1992, 1995, 1999, 2003
 Bulgarian Runner-up (20): 1967, 1971, 1972, 1974, 1975, 1983, 1984, 1985, 1986, 1991, 1993, 1994, 1996, 2000, 2001, 2002, 2004, 2005, 2007, 2011
 Bulgarian Cup (17): 1968, 1974, 1977, 1979, 1980, 1982, 1984, 1985, 1988, 1989, 1990, 1991, 1995, 1996, 1999, 2000, 2005

Notable players
Konstantin Mihailov (1984 to 2004)

References

External links
Official website
Club profile on hockeyarenas.net

 
1953 establishments in Bulgaria
Bulgarian Hockey League teams
Ice hockey clubs established in 1953
Ice hockey teams in Bulgaria